Norwegian Food Safety Authority is a Norwegian government agency responsible for safe food and drinking water, and works within the fields of human, plant, fish and animal health as well as environmentally friendly production and ethically acceptable farming of animals and fish . Other duties are related to cosmetics, medicines and inspection of animal health personnel.

Main offices are located in Oslo while there are 63 district and eight regional offices. There are also three national competence centers: fish and seafood in Bergen, plants and vegetarian foods in Ås, and animals and carnivore food in Sandnes. The agency was created in 2003 when four government agencies (the States Food Authority, the Fisheries Directories Seafood Control, the States Animal Authority and the Norwegian Agricultural Inspection Service) were merged with 69 municipal food authorities.

References

See also 
 Food Administration

Food Safety Authority
Government agencies established in 2003
Organisations based in Oslo
Food safety organizations
Ministry of Agriculture and Food (Norway)
Medical and health organisations based in Norway
Regulation in Norway
2003 establishments in Norway